Trichromia persimilis is a species of moth from the family Erebidae first described by Walter Rothschild in 1909. It is found in French Guiana, Brazil, Peru and Suriname.

References

persimilis
Moths described in 1909
Moths of South America
Fauna of South America